Raphael Durek (born 2 February 1984) is a former Brazilian-born Australian tennis player.

Durek has a career high ATP singles ranking of 400 achieved on 20 September 2004. He also has a career high ATP doubles ranking of 150 achieved on 1 December 2003.

Durek won one ATP Challenger doubles title at the 2007 Abierto de Puebla.

References

External links

1984 births
Living people
Australian male tennis players
Tennis players from Sydney
Sportspeople from Belo Horizonte
Brazilian emigrants to Australia